Dolzhik is a rural locality (a khutor) in Krinichenskoye Rural Settlement, Ostrogozhsky District, Voronezh Oblast, Russia. The population was 350 as of 2010. There are 11 streets.

Geography 
Dolzhik is located 12 km southeast of Ostrogozhsk (the district's administrative centre) by road. Litvinovka is the nearest rural locality.

References 

Rural localities in Ostrogozhsky District